Sudentaival is the third full-length studio album by the black metal band Horna. Roughly translated, sudentaival means "the wolf's path". It was released in 2001 by Woodcut Records. An LP version was later released by Sombre Records and was limited to 350 copies. The South American version includes two bonus tracks, "Koston Talvi" and "Voitonmalja".
These were the very first tracks done with Corvus.

Track listing
All music by Aarni T. Otava and Shatraug. Lyrics by Satanic Warmaster and Shatraug. Arranged by Horna.

Personnel
Satanic Warmaster: vocals
Shatraug: guitars
Aarni T. Otava: guitars
Vrasjarn: bass guitar
Gorthaur: drums

Production
Produced and recorded by Jussi Jauhiainen; recording assisted by Sauli Impola.
Mixed by Anssi Kippo, Studio Astia A, January 19–20.
Mastered by Mika Jussila at Finnvox Studios, February 8, 2001.
Logo by Christophe Szpajdel.

External links
Metal Archives
Official Horna website

Horna albums
2001 albums